Yevheniy Shestakov (born 17 September 1976) is a retired male boxer from Ukraine.

He represented his native country at the 1996 Summer Olympics in Atlanta, Georgia, where he was stopped in the first round of the men's featherweight division (– 57 kg) by Bulgaria's eventual silver medalist Serafim Todorov.

References
"Yevheniy Shestakov" at SR(sports reference)/Olympic Sports

1976 births
Living people
Featherweight boxers
Boxers at the 1996 Summer Olympics
Olympic boxers of Ukraine
Ukrainian male boxers